David Hamilton (11 May 1768 – 5 December 1843) was a Scottish architect based in Glasgow.  He has been called the "father of the profession" in Glasgow.

Career
Notable works include Hutchesons' Hall, Nelson Monument in Glasgow Green and Lennox Castle. The Royal Exchange in Queen Street is David Hamilton's best known building in Glasgow. It was completed in 1829, built around an existing mansion house dating from 1778. It now serves as the city's Gallery of Modern Art.

In 1835, Hamilton came third in the competition to design the Houses of Parliament (London) and won £500.  He was the only Scottish architect to win a prize for his entry.

He is known to have been sculpted by both William Mossman and Patric Park.

Thomas Gildard and John Thomas Rochead were trained by him.

He was father-in-law to the architect James Smith and maternal grandfather of the infamous Madeleine Smith.

Gallery of his work

See also 
Eglinton Tournament Bridge Designed by David Hamilton & restored in 2008.

References

Further reading
 H.M. Colvin, A Biographical Dictionary of British Architects, 1600-1840 (1997)  p. 449-452

External links

Profile at Glasgow - City of Sculpture
Dictionary of Scottish Architects: David Hamilton
Historic Glasgow Architecture - contains portrait of David Hamilton

1768 births
1843 deaths
Architects from Glasgow
19th-century Scottish architects